Annping Chin (born 1950 in Taiwan) is an American historian and sinologist. She is a senior lecturer of history at Yale. Her fields of study include Confucianism, Taoism, and the Chinese intellectual tradition. Before Yale, she was on the faculty at Wesleyan University.

Chin studied mathematics at Michigan State University and received her Ph.D. in Chinese thought from Columbia University. She lives in West Haven, Connecticut, with her husband Jonathan Spence until his death in 2021. She has two children, writer Mei Chin and video game designer Yar Woo.

Chin was born in Taiwan in 1950 to a Manchu family from Liaoning. In 1962, she and her family moved to the U.S and have lived there ever since.

Publications 
Chin has written or translated six books:

The Analects (Penguin Classics, 2014), a new translation and commentary on the Analects of Confucius
Confucius: A Life of Thought and Politics (Yale University Press, 2009)
The Authentic Confucius: A Life of Thought and Politics (Scribner, 2007)
Four Sisters of Hofei (Scribner, 2002), a history of China's last century through the lives of four highly educated and accomplished sisters including Chang Ch'ung-ho
Tai Chen on Mencius (Yale University Press, 1990), a study of eighteenth-century Chinese intellectual history
Children of China: Voices from Recent Years (Knopf, 1989), based on interviews with Chinese children living in the People's Republic of China

She also co-authored, with her husband Jonathan Spence, Chinese Century: A Photographic History of the Last Hundred Years (Random House, 1996).

References

1950 births
Living people
American academics of Chinese descent
American people of Manchu descent
American sinologists
Columbia Graduate School of Arts and Sciences alumni
Historians of China
Michigan State University alumni
People from West Haven, Connecticut
Taiwanese emigrants to the United States
Taiwanese people of Manchu descent
Taiwanese people from Liaoning
Wesleyan University faculty
Yale University faculty